The 2014–15 Texas A&M–Corpus Christi Islanders men's basketball team represented Texas A&M University–Corpus Christi in the 2014–15 NCAA Division I women's basketball season. This was head coach Royce Chadwick's third season at Texas A&M–Corpus Christi. The Islanders are members of the Southland Conference and played their home games at the American Bank Center and the Dugan Wellness Center.  The team finished the season with a 16–14 record including one game in the 2015 Southland Conference women's basketball tournament. The Islanders's conference record was 12–6 with a fourth-place finish.

Media
Video streaming of all non-televised home games and audio for all road games is available at GoIslanders.com.

Roster

Schedule and Results

|-
!colspan=9 style="background:#0067C5; color:#9EA2A4;"| Exhibition

|-
!colspan=9 style="background:#007F3E; color:#9EA2A4;"| Out of Conference Schedule

|-
!colspan=9 style="background:#0067C5; color:#9EA2A4;"| Southland Conference Schedule

|-
!colspan=9 style="background:#007F3E; color:#9EA2A4;" |Southland Conference tournament

See also
 2014–15 Texas A&M–Corpus Christi Islanders men's basketball team

References

Texas A&M–Corpus Christi Islanders women's basketball seasons
Texas AandM-Corpus Christi
Texas AandM-Corpus Christi Islanders basketball
Texas AandM-Corpus Christi Islanders basketball